Haji Kombo Mussa is a Tanzanian CUF politician and Member of Parliament for Chake Chake constituency since 2010.

References

Living people
Civic United Front MPs
Tanzanian MPs 2010–2015
Year of birth missing (living people)
Zanzibari politicians